EUREL (Convention of National Associations of Electrical Engineers of Europe) is a non-profit, non-governmental organization incorporating member associations in countries across greater Europe. EUREL has set its objectives to facilitate the exchange of information and to foster a wider dissemination of scientific, technical and related knowledge relevant to electrical engineering, as well as standardization in the field of electrical engineering.

Viewed in the 1980s as "the European counterpart to IEEE", EUREL co-organized a range of events with IEEE, including many years of EUROCON — the European Conference on Electrotechnics.

Despite expansion over the years to Eastern Europe and beyond, the organization that started in 1972 as the Convention of National Societies of Electrical Engineers of Western Europe, saw a certain decline in its membership in the new millennium, and as of April 2016 it encompassed associations from 10 countries.

EUREL's headquarters are located in Brussels, Belgium.

Programs 
The EUREL international programs include project groups, professional events and specialized industry taskforces, as well as representation with the European Union. Some notable examples include:
 Electrical Power Vision 2040 for Europe
 Energy Transition for Europe
 International Conference on the Detection of Abandoned Land Mines
 European Conference on Optical Communication (ECOC)
 International Conference on Radio Spectrum Conservation Techniques
 European Conference on Antennas and Propagation (EUCAP)

The EUREL Young Engineers' Panel (YEP) organizes events for students and young professionals in the field of electrical engineering, such as the Young Engineer Seminar (YES) and the International Management Cup (IMC).

Member associations 
EUREL has always accepted only national electrical engineering organizations as its members, and has kept its supraorganization structure.
Members of EUREL take part in the organization's international programs, enjoy the services of the office of EUREL's secretary general, and may take advantage of reciprocal benefits with other participating associations (e.g. events, discounts, and the use of libraries and conference rooms).

The EUREL member network comprises the following national associations:

See also 
 IEEE (Institute of Electrical and Electronics Engineers)
 FEANI (European Federation of National Engineering Associations)
 EESTEC (Electrical Engineering Students' European Association)

References

External links 
 

Electrical engineering organizations
Electrical safety standards organizations
Engineering societies
International organisations based in Belgium
International professional associations based in Europe
Organizations established in 1972